Hadamard's maximal determinant problem, named after Jacques Hadamard, asks for the largest determinant of a matrix with elements equal to 1 or −1.  The analogous question for matrices with elements equal to 0 or 1 is equivalent since, as will be shown below, the maximal determinant of a {1,−1} matrix of size n is 2n−1 times the maximal determinant of a {0,1} matrix of size n−1.  The problem was posed by Hadamard in the 1893 paper in which he presented his famous determinant bound and remains unsolved for matrices of general size.  Hadamard's bound implies that {1, −1}-matrices of size n have determinant at most nn/2.  Hadamard observed that a construction of Sylvester
produces examples of matrices that attain the bound when n is a power of 2, and produced examples of his own of sizes 12 and 20.  He also showed that the bound is only attainable when n is equal to 1, 2, or a multiple of 4.  Additional examples were later constructed by Scarpis and Paley and subsequently by many other authors.  Such matrices are now known as Hadamard matrices.  They have received intensive study.

Matrix sizes n for which n ≡ 1, 2, or 3 (mod 4) have received less attention. The earliest results are due to Barba, who tightened Hadamard's bound for n odd, and Williamson, who found the largest determinants for n=3, 5, 6, and 7.  Some important results include
 tighter bounds, due to Barba, Ehlich, and Wojtas, for n ≡ 1, 2, or 3 (mod 4), which, however, are known not to be always attainable,
 a few infinite sequences of matrices attaining the bounds for n ≡ 1 or 2 (mod 4),
 a number of matrices attaining the bounds for specific n ≡ 1 or 2 (mod 4),
 a number of matrices not attaining the bounds for specific n ≡ 1 or 3 (mod 4), but that have been proved by exhaustive computation to have maximal determinant.

The design of experiments in statistics makes use of {1, −1} matrices X (not necessarily square) for which the information matrix XTX has maximal determinant.  (The notation XT denotes the transpose of X.)  Such matrices are known as D-optimal designs.  If X is a square matrix, it is known as a saturated D-optimal design.

Hadamard matrices
Any two rows of an n×n Hadamard matrix are orthogonal. For a {1, −1} matrix, it means any two rows differ in exactly half of the entries, which is impossible when n is an odd number.  When n ≡ 2 (mod 4), two rows that are both orthogonal to a third row cannot be orthogonal to each other.  Together, these statements imply that an n×n Hadamard matrix can exist only if n = 1, 2, or a multiple of 4.  Hadamard matrices have been well studied, but it is not known whether an n×n Hadamard matrix exists for every n that is a positive multiple of 4.  The smallest n for which an n×n Hadamard matrix is not known to exist is 668.

Equivalence and normalization of {1, −1} matrices
Any of the following operations, when performed on a {1, −1} matrix R, changes the determinant of R only by a minus sign: 
 Negation of a row.
 Negation of a column.
 Interchange of two rows.
 Interchange of two columns.
Two {1,−1} matrices, R1 and R2, are considered equivalent if R1 can be converted to R2 by some sequence of the above operations.  The determinants of equivalent matrices are equal, except possibly for a sign change, and it is often convenient to standardize R by means of negations and permutations of rows and columns.  A {1, −1} matrix is normalized if all elements in its first row and column equal 1.  When the size of a matrix is odd, it is sometimes useful to use a different normalization in which every row and column contains an even number of elements 1 and an odd number of elements −1.  Either of these normalizations can be accomplished using the first two operations.

Connection of the maximal determinant problems for {1, −1} and {0, 1} matrices
There is a one-to-one map from the set of normalized n×n {1, −1} matrices to the set of (n−1)×(n-1) {0, 1} matrices under which the magnitude of the determinant is reduced by a factor of 21−n.  This map consists of the following steps.
 Subtract row 1 of the {1, −1} matrix from rows 2 through n.  (This does not change the determinant.)
 Extract the (n−1)×(n−1) submatrix consisting of rows 2 through n and columns 2 through n.  This matrix has elements 0 and −2.  (The determinant of this submatrix is the same as that of the original matrix, as can be seen by performing a cofactor expansion on column 1 of the matrix obtained in Step 1.)
 Divide the submatrix by −2 to obtain a {0, 1} matrix.  (This multiplies the determinant by (−2)1−n.)
Example:

In this example, the original matrix has determinant −16 and its image has determinant 2 = −16·(−2)−3.

Since the determinant of a {0, 1} matrix is an integer, the determinant of an n×n {1, −1} matrix is an integer multiple of 2n−1.

Upper bounds on the maximal determinant

Gram matrix
Let R be an n by n {1, −1} matrix. The Gram matrix of R is defined to be the matrix G = RRT.  From this definition it follows that G
 is an integer matrix,
 is symmetric,
 is positive-semidefinite,
 has constant diagonal whose value equals n.
Negating rows of R or applying a permutation to them results in the same negations and permutation being applied both to the rows, and to the corresponding columns, of G.  We may also define the matrix G′=RTR.  The matrix G is the usual Gram matrix of a set of vectors, derived from the set of rows of R, while G′ is the Gram matrix derived from the set of columns of R.  A matrix R for which G = G′ is a normal matrix.  Every known maximal-determinant matrix is equivalent to a normal matrix, but it is not known whether this is always the case.

Hadamard's bound (for all n)
Hadamard's bound can be derived by noting that |det R| = (det G)1/2 ≤ (det nI)1/2 = nn/2, which is a consequence of the observation that nI, where I is the n by n identity matrix, is the unique matrix of maximal determinant among matrices satisfying properties 1–4.  That det R must be an integer multiple of 2n−1 can be used to provide another demonstration that Hadamard's bound is not always attainable.  When n is odd, the bound nn/2 is either non-integer or odd, and is therefore unattainable except when n = 1.  When n = 2k with k odd, the highest power of 2 dividing Hadamard's bound is 2k which is less than 2n−1 unless n = 2.  Therefore, Hadamard's bound is unattainable unless n = 1, 2, or a multiple of 4.

Barba's bound for n odd
When n is odd, property 1 for Gram matrices can be strengthened to
 G is an odd-integer matrix.
This allows a sharper upper bound to be derived: |det R| = (det G)1/2 ≤ (det (n-1)I+J)1/2 = (2n−1)1/2(n−1)(n−1)/2, where J is the all-one matrix.  Here (n-1)I+J is the maximal-determinant matrix satisfying the modified property 1 and properties 2–4.  It is unique up to multiplication of any set of rows and the corresponding set of columns by −1.  The bound is not attainable unless 2n−1 is a perfect square, and is therefore never attainable when n ≡ 3 (mod 4).

The Ehlich–Wojtas bound for n ≡ 2 (mod 4)
When n is even, the set of rows of R can be partitioned into two subsets.
 Rows of even type contain an even number of elements 1 and an even number of elements −1.
 Rows of odd type contain an odd number of elements 1 and an odd number of elements −1.
The dot product of two rows of the same type  is congruent to n (mod 4); the dot product of two rows of opposite type is congruent to n+2 (mod 4).  When n ≡ 2 (mod 4), this implies that, by permuting rows of R, we may assume the standard form,

where A and D are symmetric integer matrices whose elements are congruent to 2 (mod 4) and B is a matrix whose elements are congruent to 0 (mod 4).  In 1964, Ehlich and Wojtas independently showed that in the maximal determinant matrix of this form, A and D are both of size n/2 and equal to (n−2)I+2J while B is the zero matrix.  This optimal form is unique up to multiplication of any set of rows and the corresponding set of columns by −1 and to simultaneous application of a permutation to rows and columns.  This implies the bound det R ≤ (2n−2)(n−2)(n−2)/2.  Ehlich showed that if R attains the bound, and if the rows and columns of R are permuted so that both G = RRT and G′ = RTR have the standard form and are suitably normalized, then we may write

where W, X, Y, and Z are (n/2)×(n/2) matrices with constant row and column sums w, x, y, and z that satisfy z = −w, y = x, and w2+x2 = 2n−2.  Hence the Ehlich–Wojtas bound is not attainable unless 2n−2 is expressible as the sum of two squares.

Ehlich's bound for n ≡ 3 (mod 4)
When n is odd, then by using the freedom to multiply rows by −1, one may impose the condition that each row of R contain an even number of elements 1 and an odd number of elements −1.  It can be shown that, if this normalization is assumed, then property 1 of G may be strengthened to
 G is a matrix with integer elements congruent to n (mod 4).
When n ≡ 1 (mod 4), the optimal form of Barba satisfies this stronger property, but when n ≡ 3 (mod 4), it does not.  This means that the bound can be sharpened in the latter case.  Ehlich showed that when n ≡ 3 (mod 4), the strengthened property 1 implies that the maximal-determinant form of G can be written as B−J where J is the all-one matrix and B is a block-diagonal matrix whose diagonal blocks are of the form (n-3)I+4J.  Moreover, he showed that in the optimal form, the number of blocks, s, depends on n as shown in the table below, and that each block either has size r or size r+1 where 

Except for n=11 where there are two possibilities, the optimal form is unique up to multiplication of any set of rows and the corresponding set of columns by −1 and to simultaneous application of a permutation to rows and columns.  This optimal form leads to the bound

where v = n−rs is the number of blocks of size r+1 and u =s−v is the number of blocks of size r.  
Cohn analyzed the bound and determined that, apart from n = 3, it is an integer only for n = 112t2±28t+7 for some positive integer t.  Tamura derived additional restrictions on the attainability of the bound using the Hasse–Minkowski theorem on the rational equivalence of quadratic forms, and showed that the smallest n > 3 for which Ehlich's bound is conceivably attainable is 511.

Maximal determinants up to size 21
The maximal determinants of {1, −1} matrices up to size n = 21 are given in the following table.  Size 22 is the smallest open case.  In the table, D(n) represents the maximal determinant divided by 2n−1.  Equivalently, D(n) represents the maximal determinant of a {0, 1} matrix of size n−1.

References

Combinatorial design
Matrices
Unsolved problems in mathematics